Nathalie Andrea Arias Arias is an Ecuadorian politician in the Creating Opportunities party (CREO). She was elected in 2021 to Ecuador's 4th National Assembly

Life
She worked for Ecuador's politicians. Between 2013 and 2017 she worked for Patricio Donoso who was 2nd Vice President of the Assembly. In 2019 she began working for Rina Campain who was the only woman elected to the assembly from the CREO party. She stood for election with seven years of experience as a legislative advisor.

She is a member of the Creating Opportunities party. She was elected in May 2021 to Ecuador's National Assembly.

References

Members of the National Congress (Ecuador)
Members of the National Assembly (Ecuador)
21st-century Ecuadorian politicians
21st-century Ecuadorian women politicians
Women members of the National Assembly (Ecuador)
Living people
Year of birth missing (living people)